Cardiff Market, also known as Cardiff Central Market and as the Market Building, is a Victorian indoor market in the Castle Quarter of Cardiff city centre, capital city of Wales.

Background

Originally the site of Cardiff gaol, the gallows were located on the site of the current St. Mary Street entrance, where Dic Penderyn was hanged on 13 August 1831.

The market was designed by the Borough Surveyor, William Harpur, and opened in May 1891. A farmers' market is known to have existed at the site since the 18th century.

The market consists of two shopping levels, a ground floor and a balcony level which wraps around the market exterior walls on the interior. Entrances to the market are located at St. Mary Street, Trinity Street and from an alleyway off Church Street.

A large H. Samuel clock has hung above the High Street entrance since 1910. The current clock dates from 1963 (by Smith of Derby) and was restored at a cost of £25,000 in 2011.

Since 1975 the building has been listed and is currently Grade II*.

Stallholders

Traders in the market offer a variety of fresh produce, cooked food, various delicacies and more durable goods.

A trader of note is Ashton's the fishmongers, who claim to have traded in the market since 1866  at the Trinity Street entrance selling a wide range of fresh seafood. In 2012 they hit the headlines when they sold meat from a 20 foot long 550 lb thresher shark.

Another longstanding trader is The Market Deli, a small, family-run business trading for over 100 years, located at the same stall since 1928.

See also
 List of shopping arcades in Cardiff

References

External links

Cardiff Market (official site)
Cardiff Market (Cardiff Council site)

Landmarks in Cardiff
Retail markets in Wales
Grade II* listed buildings in Cardiff
Shopping in Cardiff
Shopping arcades in Cardiff
Food markets in the United Kingdom
Castle, Cardiff